Isola is a village in Maloja, Graubünden, Switzerland. It is located on the shores of Lake Sils at the end of Val Fedoz.

Villages in Switzerland
Bregaglia